The Canadian Screen Award for Best Makeup is an annual Canadian film award category, presented as part of the Genie Awards prior to 2012 and Canadian Screen Awards since 2012, to honour achievements by make-up artists in the Canadian film industry.

As the Canadian film industry was historically dominated by naturalistic films that rarely required very complex make-up work, the award was originally created as a special achievement award rather than a regular category. It was presented at the discretion of the Academy of Canadian Cinema and Television when it deemed a film's make-up work to be worthy of special recognition, and was awarded for the first time at the 11th Genie Awards in 1990 to recognize Jacques Lafleur and Pierre Saindon for their work in the film Cruising Bar, in which Michel Côté played four different characters. The award was next given at the 18th Genie Awards in 1997, again to Saindon for his work in Karmina.

The award was not presented again until the 27th Genie Awards, but was then presented at both the 28th Genie Awards and the 29th Genie Awards.

Beginning with the 30th Genie Awards, the award has since been presented annually as a conventional category with a full advance shortlist of nominees.

Winners and nominees

1990s

2000s

2010s

2020s

See also
Prix Iris for Best Makeup

References

Makeup
Film awards for makeup and hairstyling